, known as  (24 June 1772 – 7 January 1830), was a Savoyard aristocrat. During the French Revolution, she became a popular  hostess in Paris, and modelled for Jacques-Louis David's 1799 painting The Intervention of the Sabine Women.

Married to an officer in the Sardinian army, de Bellegarde fled Savoy at the outbreak of the French Revolutionary Wars in 1792, but returned at the end of the year to protect her family property from confiscation. She became the lover of Marie-Jean Hérault de Séchelles, and accompanied him to Paris in 1793. After de Séchelles' arrest and execution, she was in turn arrested and imprisoned in the Saint-Lazare prison, where she met Aimée de Coigny, a prominent . Released after the fall of Maximilien Robespierre in July 1793, de Bellegarde became a fixture of  culture and established relationships with many leading figures of the period, including Talleyrand, Thérésa Tallien and Rouget de Lisle.

De Bellegarde's role in the creation of The Intervention of the Sabine Women has been described as part of the painting's "legend". It provoked numerous, often contradictory, Parisian stories and rumours, which often revolved around de Bellegarde's status as a sex symbol. Her involvement, along with that of her sister Aurore, was considered a significant influence on Parisian cultural tastes, and has been discussed at length in later scholarship on the painting.

She maintained her  during the French Empire, where she became known as a royalist and an opponent of Napoleon, and during the Bourbon Restoration. In later life, she became known for her religious and charitable activity in the town of Chenoise, where she owned a château. She died in Paris on 7 January 1830.

The art historian Ewa Lajer-Burcharth has written that the sisters were "known to epitomise the whole world of fashionable femininity under the Directoire."

Early life and family

 was born on 24 June 1772 in Chambéry, the former capital of the Duchy of Savoy and its largest city on the French side of the Alps.

Her mother, Marie Charlotte Adélaïde Le Cat d'Hervilly, was a Picard noblewoman and sister of the French general Louis Charles d'Hervilly. The family divided their time between the castle and an hôtel particulier at 1 Rue Croix-d'Or in Chambéry. Her sister  was born on 30 September 1774, while her mother died giving birth to her youngest sister,  (known as ) on 3 July 1776.

On 5 November 1787, de Bellegarde was married to Friedrich de Bellegarde, the son of her father's brother Jean-François de Bellegarde and a frequent visitor to the family home. Friedrich, a freemason, a native of Saxony and a captain in the Sardinian army, was thirty-five; she was fifteen. The couple had two children — a daughter and a son — between 1787 and 1791.

French invasion of Savoy (1792) 

After the beginning of the French Revolution in 1789, tensions grew between France and its monarchical neighbours, including the Kingdom of Sardinia, of which Savoy was a part, largely over the mutual hostility between revolutionary and monarchical ideals, the perceived threat to the revolutionary state from émigré aristocrats, and European monarchs' concern for the safety and rule of Louis XVI. Riots broke out across Savoy, including in Chambéry, prompted by unrest at the French abolition of seigneurial dues (which prompted calls among the rural population for the same) and at rising prices, partly caused by the immigration of wealthy French aristocrats. Little is known of de Bellegarde during this period: Vermale suggests that she and her husband may have sheltered some of the numerous French émigrés who fled across the border to Savoy.

On 20 April 1792, the French National Assembly voted for war with Austria and France invaded the Austrian Netherlands, beginning the War of the First Coalition. In August, news reached Savoy that the French armies were preparing an invasion. The château was made the headquarters of the Sardinian forces, commanded by General de Lazary.

In early September, Friedrich ordered Adèle and Aurore to leave for Piedmont, to which most of the Savoyard nobility not involved in the military preparation were already in the process of evacuating. According to the de Bellegardes' biographer Ernest Daudet, the sisters were reluctant to leave, as they had been hopefully expecting a French victory. Their friend Aimée de Coigny later wrote that they had been "" ("happy to become Frenchwomen").

The Kingdom of Sardinia declared war on revolutionary France on 21 September 1792, the day after the French victory at the Battle of Valmy. By 4 October, the French were in total control: the advancing Montesquiou wrote from Chambéry that "the  cockade is displayed everywhere", and modern historians have noted the apparent enthusiasm of the Savoyard public for annexation by France.

The administration of Savoy passed to a hastily-gathered popular assembly known as the National Assembly of the Allobroges, which issued a decree in October threatening to confiscate the property of those exiles who did not return by 26 December. Friedrich, who was still in the Sardinian army, agreed with Adèle and Aurore that the women would return to Savoy, leaving their children with him in Piedmont. Savoy was annexed to France on 27 November: the two sisters had returned to Chambéry by 1 December, when they registered their return with the municipal government. When asked about her husband, de Bellegarde claimed to know neither his whereabouts nor his intentions, and to have no responsibility for his absence.

Revolutionary Savoy (1792–1793) 
Following the annexation of Savoy, the National Assembly sent a delegation of four commissioners to organise the new administrative , which would be centred upon Chambéry. The commissioners were Hérault de Séchelles, Grégoire Jagot, Henri Grégoire and Philibert Simond, a native of the region. The delegates arrived on 14 December alongside the general François Christophe de Kellermann, who replaced Montesquiou as commander of the French Army of the Alps and established his headquarters in Chambéry.

Throughout late 1792 and into 1793, revolutionary violence increased across France, leading into what became known as "The Reign of Terror". Louis XVI was executed on 23 January 1793; in the remainder of France, at least fifty Savoyards were executed, while others were killed in the region, which ordered — but does not appear to have used — a guillotine from Paris. De Bellegarde and de Séchelles became lovers during this period, and rumours arose in Chambéry that the sixteen-year-old Aurore had likewise begun a relationship with Simond — a defrocked priest who, at thirty-eight, was more than twice her age — which attached to her the unflattering nickname of "the Simonette". The lavish hospitality shown by the sisters to their guests was also a source of intrigue: the de Bellegardes organised parties in honour of the delegates, and Kellerman is said to have boastfully remarked, after a stay at the château, that "" ("their hospitality was as complete as could be"). The sisters' influence with the commissioners has been credited with protecting several Savoyard aristocrats from execution, and securing their release from prison.

The de Bellegarde sisters, perhaps aware of the dangers of being labelled as "aristocrats", hosted parties and gatherings for revolutionary leaders in both their  and at their château. They took to wearing sans-culotte clothing and kept company with a revolutionary known as "Princess Pistol". On 18 May 1793, de Séchelles and Simond, whose zealous application of revolutionary law had  made them widely despised in Savoy, left for Paris, accompanied by Adèle and Aurore. Adèle's husband, Friedrich, was stationed in command of a grenadier regiment at the Little St Bernard Pass: his fellow officer, the marquis Henry-Joseph Costa, informed Friedrich of the news, which he had heard from his own wife living near Chambéry. This was the first that Friedrich had heard of his wife since March, when Adèle's letters had ceased. According to Costa's great-grandson, Charles-Albert, de Bellegarde was heartened to learn that she was not dead, "but would have preferred that his wife were somewhere other than Paris." Whether Costa informed de Bellegarde of his wife's infidelity is unknown.

Paris: The Reign of Terror (1793–1794) 

The journey from Chambéry to Paris took about a week. It is possible that de Bellegarde moved in with him, at least initially, though Merlin states that she rented an apartment. The de Bellegarde sisters lived openly and took an active part in Parisian society: de Coigny later wrote "" ("their pretty appearance and their youth were pleasing to everyone's eyes"). Around 1793, de Bellegarde held a fashionable  in Paris. At some point in the same year, they purchased a château in Chenoise, which had previously been the home of their mother's family but had been confiscated after their uncle, Louis Charles d'Hervilly, fled France as an émigré. 

The sisters became closely acquainted with the aristocrat and artist , then known as "citizen Brûlart", and other members of Parisian high society. By October, they were living in a house with de Valence. The three women also formed a close friendship with Rouget de Lisle, the composer of La Marseillaise, with whom they dined frequently and to whom Adèle wrote several letters. De Bellegarde maintained her correspondence with de Lisle after he was arrested for his royalist sympathies and imprisoned in 1793. On the day of his arrest, de Lisle wrote to de Bellegarde, seeking her help in persuading de Séchelles — whom de Lisle believed had ordered it — to have him set free; she wrote back that he could not help, but attempted to assure de Lisle that de Séchelles had played no part in the matter. De Valence was also arrested and imprisoned, probably in February or March 1794.

De Séchelles was considered an ally of Georges Danton, whom Maximilien Robespierre (a leading figure of the Committee of Public Safety, France's de facto government) believed to working with foreign powers to subvert the revolution. Along with other so-called "Dantonists", de Séchelles was arrested on 16 March 1794 and imprisoned in the Luxembourg Palace alongside Philibert Simond, who was taken there on the same day. De Séchelles was executed by guillotine on 5 April: according to Antoine-Vincent Arnault, a woman's hand, which Daudet suspected to have been de Bellegarde's, was seen bidding him farewell from the window of a nearby building. In the aftermath of de Séchelles' execution, several members of his family and a number of his associates were arrested, and some were executed. Simond was guillotined on 10 April.  

On 23 April, the de Bellegarde sisters were arrested, according to the Committee of Public Safety, "" ("as a public security measure"). Vermale suggests that Adèle was suspected of spying for Sardinia. They were held in the Saint-Lazare prison until 27 July. During this period, which seems to have been fairly comfortable, they met and befriended other aristocratic women imprisoned alongside them, including their long-term friend Aimée de Coigny. The fall of Maximilien Robespierre in July prompted a widespread release of prisoners detained under the "Reign of Terror", including the de Bellegarde sisters and de Lisle; Coigny, who had been condemned to death, had already been released through the intercession of her future husband, Casimir, Comte de Montrond. According to Armand Praviel, de Bellegarde, as with other prominent aristocratic women of the period, "only escaped the guillotine by chance."

Later life (1794–1820) 

After their release, the de Bellegarde sisters lived together with de Coigny in an apartment on the Rue d'Amboise, and also rented a country house in Épinay-sur-Orge. Later, they moved to 8 Rue du Jardinet in Passy. They were prominent in  culture, and frequently called on exclusive and fashionable hostesses such as Thérésa Tallien, Germaine de Staël and the future empress Josephine Beauharnais. Their own  was popular with artists and intellectuals, and, according to de Coigny, was one of the first to resume  culture after the Terror. They hosted notables such as Thomas-Alexandre Dumas, Kellerman and Alexandre — all of whom, as Adèle complained in a letter to de Lisle, she found excruciatingly boring.

In the winter of 1797, the sisters returned to Savoy, staying in Chambéry until February 1798. Vermale suggests that they may have taken part in the ball thrown by Talleyrand for Napoleon on 15 January 1798, celebrating the general's return from Italy, to which he invited "" ("the prettiest and most elegant women in Paris"), who attended in Greco-Roman costume.

After the Republic (1804–1830) 
After Napoleon's coronation in December 1804, de la Fuye writes, the de Bellegardes "waged … a campaign of resistance in the manner of Mme. de Staël", whose network of contacts and -goers (known as the Coppet group) has been described as a "centre on the periphery" in opposition to Napoleonic Paris. Their long-time associate Talleyrand had, since at least 1808, been convinced that Napoleon would eventually be defeated and secretly working with foreign powers against him; in Vermale's analysis, the de Bellegarde's turned most significantly against Napoleon in 1812, during the failed French invasion of Russia. According to an anecdote told by Élisabeth Vigée Le Brun, who visited their  during the period, the sisters read a newspaper report on the retreat from Moscow: seeing that it ended with an optimistic comment about the emperor's health, they "" ("threw the newspaper away in a blaze of indignation").

For the most part, they lived quietly, though they gained a reputation as royalists. In September, they joined a group of Savoyards in Chambéry (which was still under French control) agitating for the region to remain part of France. The de Bellegardes took refuge in Nyon in Switzerland. While there, they met Alphonse de Lamartine, who would become famous in the 1820s as a poet, and interceded on his behalf in a quarrel with a Bernese officer, who had spoken in praise of Napoleon. 

After the Battle of Waterloo in June 1815, de Bellegarde and Aurore visited de Staël at Coppet, then returned to France. They lived for a while in Épinay-sur-Orge with de Coigny; afterwards, they divided their time between winters in Paris and summers in Chenoise. There, de la Fuye records that "" ("they were the providence of the unfortunate"), to whom they opened their home alongside the elite of French society. Frequent visitors included Talleyrand, the Dukes of Polignac and Louis Henri, Prince of Condé, who maintained a set of hunting equipment there. They were also known for their public balls, held in front of their château. 

In later life, both sisters turned to religion, and Aurore became a "Canoness of the Royal Chapel of Saint Anne of Munich" in 1826. A regular caller at their house was the royalist political theorist turned priest Antoine Eugène Genoud, who mentioned the de Bellegarde sisters in his memoirs and acted as a tutor to Adèle's son Louis. 

De Bellegarde died on 7 January 1830 in Paris, at her son's apartment on Rue Voltaire. In her will, she expressed her wish to be buried in the churchyard at Chenoise, without expense, and that a hundred francs be given to the poor. After her death, Aurore placed a stone in the churchyard with an inscription in Adèle's memory and the words "" ("pray for she that loved you"), but the location of her tomb is unknown. Aurore died on 7 March 1840, and was buried in Montmartre Cemetery.

Work with Jacques-Louis David 

Jacques-Louis David began planning The Intervention of the Sabine women during his imprisonment in the Palais du Luxembourg from 29 May to 3 August 1795. According to a popular account, he was inspired to paint it in honour of his then-estranged wife, Charlotte, after she visited him there. He began preparations shortly after his release, in the autumn of 1795, assisted in his research by his student Pierre-Maximilien Delafontaine. From February 1796, he worked in a temporary studio in the Louvre, and later moved to premises on the Champs-Élysées, where his meeting with the de Bellegardes took place. 

The female models for The Intervention of the Sabine Women were aristocratic women, whose appearances David blended with those of Classical sculptures. Numerous apocryphal anecdotes arose in Paris about their involvement in the painting, particularly regarding how David came to meet the de Bellegarde sisters, which have been described as part of the painting's "legend".

Aurore de Bellegarde became David's model for Hersilia, while Adèle modelled for the crouching figure seen to her right. Sources disagree as to how the arrangement began: in the version reported by Miette de Villars in 1850, the sisters and Thérésa Tallien, by then a leading figure in Parisian high society, heard that David had been struggling to find female models and visited his studio in the nude, offering to model for Hersilia. David is said to have exclaimed "" (", here I am like Paris in front of the three Graces!"). Certainly, both de Bellegarde sisters were well known among the Parisian art world, and for their acquaintance with artists of various genres.

In de Villars' version, David was most taken by Aurore, who sat for Hersitia, only asking Adèle and Tallien to pose "out of politeness". According to Delécluze, however, it was Adèle's long, dark hair that most interested him: at the time, he had already painted the crouching figure next to Hersitia (which had been completed by October 1796), and expressed regret that he had not had de Bellegarde's face as a model from which to do so. De Bellegarde accordingly allowed him to repaint the figure's face and hair after her own, while he used part of Aurore's leg in his figure of Hersitia. David's use of the de Bellegarde sisters as models has been interpreted as creating a link between the mythological Sabine Women and Parisian women of his own time, which has itself been interpreted as "affording a familial basis for the reconciliation of a divided and warring post-Revolutionary France". 

According to Delécluze, the attention David paid to the painting of Adèle's face led to rumours of an affair between her and the painter, which Delécluze considered baseless. Other rumours circulated as to whether she had posed fully nude.

The Intervention of the Sabine Women was first exhibited at the Louvre on December 21 1799, a few weeks after the Coup of 18 Brumaire, in what has been described as "the major artistic event of the late 1790s in Paris." Contemporaries recorded that Adèle and Aurore de Bellegarde attended the Paris Opera on the opening night of the exhibition, with their clothing and hair modelled after their appearances in the painting. The two women have been a focal point of twenty-first century scholarship on the painting. The diaphanous gowns worn by their characters were credited for starting a fashion for similar outfits, known as dresses  ("Ancient-style") among Parisian high society. Such dresses formed part of the Greek Revival Directoire style of women's clothing popular during the Directoire period, a trend closely associated with the de Bellegardes' friend Thérésa Tallien and the aristocratic subculture known as the merveilleuses ("marvellous women").

Personal life and relationships

Marriage to Friedrich de Bellegarde 

De Bellegarde married her cousin Friedrich in 1787, and had a son and a daughter with him by 1791. She secured a divorce on October 7 1794. On Adèle's release from prison in 1794, Friedrich wrote to her, via his servant, in German, demanding that she nullify the divorce. After the signing of the Treaty of Paris in 1796, which established peace between Sardinia and France but confirmed the loss of Savoy, Friedrich moved into the service of Austria, where he was seriously wounded at the Battle of Marengo, but rose to the rank of lieutenant-general and became a chamberlain to Emperor Francis II in Vienna. In 1797 or 1798, Friedrich's name was formally inscribed on a list of émigrés, placing a sequester on his property which he managed to overturn on 9 June 1798.

In March 1803, Friedrich returned to Paris: on 27 April, he obtained a judgement stating that, based on the 1798 ruling, he had never been an émigré, and so Adèle could not consider him estranged; therefore, the judgement stated that she had in fact abandoned him, and so had no right to divorce under French law. Napoleon wrote back on 10 November 1804 that the 1798 decision to return Friedrich's property rights had been "purely administrative", and so could not be used to support his claim for the nullification of the divorce, and referred the matter back to a lower court. Friedrich's suit was ultimately unsuccessful. He returned to Paris and met with Adèle in a notary's office to negotiate terms: after several meetings, the two signed an agreement on 3 April 1805 that Friedrich would no longer seek an annulment of the divorce, that the ownership of the  would pass to Adèle and Friedrich's children, and that Adèle would enjoy the use of it for life. According to Daudet, they never saw each other again. Friedrich de Bellegarde died in Graz in January 1830, a few days after Adèle and shortly after the death in childbirth of their daughter.

Lovers, friends and family 

The de Bellegarde sisters were both celebrated for their beauty and condemned for their "scandalous" sexual behaviour. Both Adèle and Aurore had many admirers among influential Parisian men, including the Minister of War Aubert du Bayet, who declared himself "mad" about them, and Boutier de Catus — a military officer and a significant figure in the prosecution that had led to de Séchelles' execution — whose marriage proposal Adèle refused in 1796.

Their reputation played a significant role in contemporary debates as women's visibility in society, as well as their sexual rights and mores, which were themselves significant to the politics and ideology of the revolutionary Republic. In the words of the art historian Darcy Grimaldo Grigsby:

Through Aimée de Coigny, who invited him to Épinay in autumn 1800, de Bellegarde met and began a relationship with the operatic singer Pierre-Jean Garat. They had two children: a son, Léon or Louis, on 16 October 1801, and a daughter on 16 July 1802. De Bellegarde and Garat's relationship ended shortly after the birth of their daughter, who was brought up by Garat: Louis was adopted by Aurore and took the name Louis de Chenoise, after the de Bellegardes' maternal family seat. In 1815, de Chenoise enlisted in the army of Louis Antoine, Duke of Angoulême, who was fighting against Napoleon on behalf of Louis XVIII: after the Second Bourbon Restoration, de Chenoise joined the French army in 1816, serving until 1833 as a cavalry officer. He died, childless, in 1837. 

De Bellegarde maintained a long-term correspondence and friendship with Rouget de Lisle, to whom she referred in her letters as "Lili". His 1797 essay  was dedicated to the de Bellegardes. She had a particularly close relationship with her sister, Aurore. In her will of December 1826, Adèle wrote: "I will never in this world be able to repay my sister all that I owe to her … God will reward her for all the good which her generous friendship has done for me, for all her generosity on my account, for her patience and her kindness. I add to this recognition the gift of all that I can give."

Footnotes

Explanatory notes

References

Bibliography

Primary sources (memoirs and personal reflections)

Secondary and academic sources

 
  
 
 
 
 
 
 
 
 
 
 
 
 
 
  
 
 
 
 
 
 
 
 
 
 
 
 
 
 
 
 
 
 
 
 
  
 
 
 
 
 
 
 
 
 
 
 
 

1772 births
1830 deaths
18th-century people from Savoy
19th-century people from Savoy
People from Chambéry
Women in the French Revolution
Prisoners and detainees of France
French socialites
French salon-holders
Models of Jacques-Louis David
18th-century French women
19th-century French women